Magomed Akhmedovich Musalov (born 9 February 1994) is a Russian-Azerbaijani football player who plays right back for SKA-Khabarovsk.

Career

Club
Musalov made his professional debut in the Russian Professional Football League for FC Anzhi-2 Makhachkala on 12 August 2014 in a game against FC Alania Vladikavkaz.

On 16 June 2018, Musalov joined FC Akhmat Grozny on loan until the end of the 2018–19 season. On 29 July 2020, Musalov left Akhmat Grozny. 
On 1 September 2020, Musalov joined Armenian club FC Pyunik. On 1 June 2022, Musalov left Pyunik after his contract expired.

International
In 2012, Musalov was involved with the Azerbaijan U19 team, but never made an appearance for them.

Personal life
He is the twin brother of Tagir Musalov.

Career statistics

Club

Honours
Pyunik
 Armenian Premier League: 2021–22

References

External links
 

1994 births
People from Tsumadinsky District
Sportspeople from Dagestan
Twin sportspeople
Living people
Russian footballers
Association football defenders
FC Anzhi Makhachkala players
FC Akhmat Grozny players
FC Pyunik players
FC SKA-Khabarovsk players
Russian Premier League players
Russian First League players
Russian Second League players
Armenian Premier League players
Russian expatriate footballers
Expatriate footballers in Armenia
Russian expatriate sportspeople in Armenia